Samuel Lewis House in Mansfield, Ohio is a Greek revival building.  It was listed on the National Register of Historic Places in 1982.

In 2013 it was The Olde Stone House, a bed and breakfast inn.

It is built of brown and orange-streaked sandstone from the Mansfield area, and was deemed to be the largest and best-preserved antebellum sandstone house in Richland County.  It was built as a one-and-a-half-story sandstone house before 1835 when it was bought by Samuel Lewis, who expanded it in 1837.

In 2017, the inn was reopened under new management and a new name. It currently operates as "The Safe House Bed and Breakfast." The owners, Christina and Jake Simpkins, purchased the property in 2015.

References

Houses on the National Register of Historic Places in Ohio
Buildings and structures in Mansfield, Ohio
Houses completed in 1837
Houses in Richland County, Ohio
National Register of Historic Places in Richland County, Ohio